Shawn Mickelonis is a  former Democratic member of the New Hampshire House of Representatives, representing the Strafford 1st District from 2006 to 2008.  He failed to win re-election in November 2008.

External links
New Hampshire House of Representatives - Shawn Mickelonis official NH House website
Project Vote Smart - Representative Shawn Mickelonis (NH) profile
Follow the Money - Shawn Mickelonis
2006 campaign contributions

Members of the New Hampshire House of Representatives
Living people
Year of birth missing (living people)